Shawanaga is an unincorporated geographic township in the Unorganized Centre Part of Parry Sound District in central Ontario, Canada.

The communities of Madigans and Skerryvore are in the township, as is a portion of Round Lake Provincial Park. Provincial Highway 69 runs through the east of the township.

References

See also
List of townships in Ontario

Communities in Parry Sound District
Geographic townships in Ontario